Urukku Manushyan is a 1986 Indian Malayalam film, directed by Crossbelt Mani. The film stars Ratheesh, Sathaar, Jayamalini and Kuthiravattam Pappu in the lead roles. The film has musical score by Guna Singh.

Cast
Ratheesh
Sathaar
Jayamalini
Kuthiravattam Pappu
Silk Smitha

Soundtrack
The music was composed by Guna Singh and the lyrics were written by Bharanikkavu Sivakumar.

References

External links
 

1986 films
1980s Malayalam-language films